Caïn may refer to:
Henri Caïn (1857–1937), French dramatist, opera and ballet librettist
Caïn (TV series), a French police procedural 
French spelling of Cain, son of Adam and Eve